The 1979 Chicago White Sox season was the team's 80th season overall, and their 79th in Major League Baseball. The team finished in fifth place in the American League West with a record of 73 wins and 87 losses, 15 games behind the first-place California Angels.

Regular season 
The team opened the season with reserve infielder Don Kessinger acting as player-manager. He was relieved of his managerial duties on August 2, with the team's record at 46-60, at which point he also retired as a player. He was replaced by coach Tony La Russa, making his major league managerial debut. The team went 27-27 the rest of the season.

Season standings

Record vs. opponents

Opening Day lineup 
 Harry Chappas, SS
 Claudell Washington, RF
 Chet Lemon, CF
 Jorge Orta, DH
 Lamar Johnson, 1B
 Alan Bannister, 2B
 Ralph Garr, LF
 Eric Soderholm, 3B
 Marv Foley, C
 Ken Kravec, P

Notable transactions 
 May 16, 1979: Nardi Contreras was signed as a free agent by the White Sox.
 June 5, 1979: 1979 Major League Baseball Draft
 Ricky Seilheimer was drafted by the White Sox in the 1st round (19th pick).
 Fran Mullins was drafted by the White Sox in the 3rd round.
 Jimmy Key was drafted by the White Sox in the 10th round, but did not sign.
 June 15, 1979: Eric Soderholm was traded by the White Sox to the Texas Rangers for Ed Farmer and Gary Holle.
 July 6, 1979: Rich Hinton was traded by the White Sox to the Seattle Mariners for Juan Bernhardt.

Roster

Disco Demolition Night 

Disco Demolition Night (also known as "Anti-Disco Night" and "Disco Sucks Night") was a promotional event that took place on July 12, 1979, at Comiskey Park in Chicago. It was held during a scheduled twi-night doubleheader between the Chicago White Sox and the Detroit Tigers. After the first game, a throng of fans stormed the field, damaging it so badly that the second game had to be forfeited to Detroit.

Player stats

Batting 
Note: G = Games played; AB = At bats; R = Runs scored; H = Hits; 2B = Doubles; 3B = Triples; HR = Home runs; RBI = Runs batted in; BB = Base on balls; SO = Strikeouts; AVG = Batting average; SB = Stolen bases

Pitching 
Note: W = Wins; L = Losses; ERA = Earned run average; G = Games pitched; GS = Games started; SV = Saves; IP = Innings pitched; H = Hits allowed; R = Runs allowed; ER = Earned runs allowed; HR = Home runs allowed; BB = Walks allowed; K = Strikeouts

Farm system

Notes

References 
 
 1979 Chicago White Sox at Baseball Reference

Chicago White Sox seasons
Chicago White Sox season
Chicago